Mosman Park railway station is a railway station on the Transperth network. It is located on the Fremantle line, 13.5 kilometres from Perth station serving the suburbs of Mosman Park and Cottesloe.

History
Although the Eastern Railway opened on 1 March 1881, regular passenger services to Mosman Park station (then called Cottesloe Beach station) only commenced on 1 March 1894. In 1896 a station-master was appointed. The name of the station was changed to Buckland Hill in 1931 and to Mosman Park in 1937 to reflect changes of name of the local government area from Cottesloe Beach Road District to Buckland Hill Road District to Mosman Park Road District.

The station closed on 1 September 1979 along with the rest of the Fremantle line, re-opening on 29 July 1983 when services were restored. To the west of the station, a now lifted freight line ran from Cottesloe to the Leighton Marshalling Yard.

Station location
Mosman Park station is located on the western edge of Mosman Park. The railway's right-of-way is between two important roads: Stirling Highway and Curtin Avenue. There is one access point to the eastbound end of the Perth-bound platform and two access points, at the eastbound end and centre, to the Fremantle-bound platform. There is a track crossing at grade level connecting the eastbound ends of the platforms.

Services
Mosman Park station is served by Transperth Fremantle line services from Fremantle to Perth that continue through to Midland via the Midland line.

Mosman Park station saw 159,850 passengers in the 2013–14 financial year.

Platforms

Bus routes
Buses only arrive and depart on the Stirling Highway, next to the Perth-bound platform. Reaching buses from Curtin Avenue or platform two requires crossing the tracks at grade level.

References

External links

Cottesloe, Western Australia
Fremantle line
Railway stations in Perth, Western Australia
Railway stations in Australia opened in 1894
Mosman Park, Western Australia